Desmond Rupert Maybery (27 March 1924 – 30 August 2009) was a South African rower who competed in the 1948 Summer Olympics. In 1948 he was a crew member of the South African boat that did not win a medal in the coxless fours event.

References

External links 
Desmond Mayberry's profile at Sports Reference LLC

1924 births
2009 deaths
South African male rowers
Olympic rowers of South Africa
Rowers at the 1948 Summer Olympics